Amplitude amplification is a technique in quantum computing which generalizes the idea behind
the Grover's search algorithm, and gives rise to a family of
quantum algorithms.
It was discovered by Gilles Brassard and
Peter Høyer in 1997,
and independently rediscovered by Lov Grover in 1998.

In a quantum computer, amplitude amplification can be used to obtain a
quadratic speedup over several classical algorithms.

Algorithm 

The derivation presented here roughly follows the one given in.
Assume we have an N-dimensional Hilbert space 
representing the state space of our quantum system, spanned by the
orthonormal computational basis states .
Furthermore assume we have a Hermitian projection operator .
Alternatively,  may be given in terms of a
Boolean oracle function

and an orthonormal operational basis
,
in which case
.
 can be used to partition
 into a direct sum of two mutually orthogonal subspaces,
the good subspace  and
the bad subspace :

In other words, we are defining a "good subspace"  via the projector .

Given a normalized state vector  with nonzero overlap with both subspaces, we can uniquely decompose it as

,
where ,
and
normalized projections of   into the
respectively.
This decomposition defines a two-dimensional subspace
, spanned by the vectors

The probability of finding the system in a good state when measured

Define a unitary operator
,
where

 flips the phase of the states in the good subspace, whereas
 flips the phase of the initial state .

 and
.
Thus in the  subspace 
corresponds to a rotation by the angle :
.

Applying   times on the state

gives
,
rotating the state between the good and bad subspaces.
After  iterations the probability of finding the
The probability is maximized if we choose
.
Up until this point each iteration increases the amplitude of the good states, hence
the name of the technique.

Applications 

Assume we have an unsorted database with N elements, and an oracle function

If there are  good entries in the database in total, then we can find them by initializing a quantum register  with  qubits where  into a uniform superposition of all the database elements  such that

and running the above algorithm. In this case the overlap of the initial state with the good subspace is equal to the square root of the frequency of the good entries in the database, . If , we can approximate the number of required iterations as

Measuring the state will now give one of the good entries with high probability. Since each application of  requires a single oracle query (assuming that the oracle is implemented as a quantum gate), we can find a good entry with just  oracle queries, thus obtaining a quadratic speedup over the best possible classical algorithm. (The classical method for searching the database would be to perform the query for every  until a solution is found, thus costing  queries.) Moreover, we can find all  solutions using  queries.

If we set the size of the set  to one, the above scenario essentially reduces to the original Grover search.

Quantum counting 
Suppose that the number of good entries is unknown. We aim to estimate  such that  for small .

This can be done by applying Fourier transforms and controlled unitary operations, as described in the quantum phase estimation algorithm. With the estimate , we can estimate , which in turn estimates .

References 

Quantum algorithms
Search algorithms